Frank Möller (born 11 July 1967) is a retired German football player. He played 3 seasons in the Bundesliga with Eintracht Frankfurt.

References

External links
 

1967 births
Living people
German footballers
Eintracht Frankfurt players
1. FSV Mainz 05 players
1. FC Nürnberg players
Bundesliga players
Association football midfielders
Sportspeople from Mainz